Aorangi railway station was a small station on the North Island Main Trunk in New Zealand.

The station was opened in 1878; and closed on 10 August 1959 for passengers and 2 November 1987 for goods traffic. There is now only a single line through the station site. Te Araroa long distance walkway passes the station site.

History 
By July 1876 the rails were in place, linking Palmerston North and Feilding, and ballasting was finished in September. The formal opening of the railway was on 19 October 1876. Charles Bull had a sawmill at Aorangi until about 1886. It had a private siding  on the Feilding side of Aorangi from 1878, but there was a complaint about trains not stopping for passengers in 1883. By 1896 there was a shelter shed and passenger platform and also a cart approach by 1911.

By 1959 there was still a shelter, platform and Borthwicks' private siding, which was the only source of local rail traffic after closure of the station on 10 August 1959. A 1949 aerial photo seems to show a shelter, where the 1967 photo (to the right) shows a white mark at the foot of the photo. In 1989 there was still a passing loop and private siding.

Aorangi Bridge 

A footbridge over the river was built in 1883. The first road bridge opened on 21 March 1893. It was replaced by a ferro-concrete bridge in 1930.

The road and railway bridges were partly swept away in a flood on 17 April 1897.

Freezing works 
A siding for the Oroua Freezing works was put in during its construction in 1915. West Coast Meat & Produce Co Ltd had the works formally opened by Prime Minister, Bill Massey, on 17 April 1916. Later that year the company changed its name to Feilding Farmers’ Freezing Company Ltd. They sold the works to Thomas Borthwick and Sons (Australasia) Ltd in 1931, who had a small shunting locomotive at Aorangi from 1931 to 1973. Rail traffic was reduced in 1944 by allowing road haulage for up to  parallel with the railway. The works became part of AFFCO from May 1992, after re-building in September 1991. The works is no longer rail connected.

References

Defunct railway stations in New Zealand
Rail transport in Manawatū-Whanganui
Buildings and structures in Manawatū-Whanganui
Railway stations opened in 1878
Railway stations closed in 1987
1878 establishments in New Zealand
1987 disestablishments in New Zealand
Feilding